Karriem Riggins is an American jazz drummer, hip hop producer, DJ and songwriter.

Biography
Riggins was born in Detroit, Michigan, United States, son of keyboardist Emmanuel Riggins. As a child, he would often watch his father perform with Grant Green, Marcus Belgrave and others. He joined the Kennedy Elementary school band in the sixth grade as a trumpeter, studying with Belgrave, where he played for two years in addition to drums before switching to drums full-time in the eighth grade.

Riggins was a DJ, producing hip-hop and performing in three different school bands at Southfield High School before leaving school in the eleventh grade. He joined Betty Carter's Jazz Ahead band soon after at age 17 and moved to New York in 1994, later joining the Mulgrew Miller trio. He also performed in bands with Steven Scott and Benny Green before joining Roy Hargrove's band in the middle of 1995.

After three years with Hargrove, Riggins joined the trio of famed bassist Ray Brown. After leaving Brown’s band, he began producing hip-hop extensively and serving as the bandleader for rapper Common’s band, A Black Girl Named Becky. Riggins had met Common in 1996, and began spending time with the rapper during visits with notable hip-hop producers.

Riggins also met J Dilla, a fellow Detroit native, in 1996. The two were later reintroduced through Common and developed a close friendship through the end of Dilla’s life. Riggins frequently cited Dilla as a primary influence and being personally responsible for helping him overcome multiple creative ruts throughout his career. During the course of their friendship, Riggins produced and appeared on multiple J Dilla albums including Welcome 2 Detroit and The Shining. He credits Dilla for purchasing the first production he ever sold, for “The Clapper” on Welcome 2 Detroit.

As a drummer, Riggins has also recorded and/or performed with Donald Byrd, Hank Jones, Milt Jackson, Oscar Peterson, Norah Jones, Cedar Walton, Roy Hargrove, Esperanza Spalding and Bobby Hutcherson. In 2011, he collaborated with former Beatle Paul McCartney in concert and on Kisses on the Bottom, McCartney’s first studio release in five years. He currently tours with another Ray Brown protégé, pianist Diana Krall.

Away from jazz, Riggins has done production work for hip hop artists including Slum Village, Erykah Badu, Common, J Dilla, The Roots, Kanye West, Talib Kweli, Kaytranada, Earl Sweatshirt, Phat Kat, Consequence and Dwele. He has collaborated with the hip hop multi-instrumentalist Madlib, performing on his 2007 album Yesterdays Universe and in collaborations entitled Supreme Team and The Jahari Massamba Unit.

Riggins released his debut full-length album, the instrumental double-LP Alone Together on Stones Throw Records on October 23, 2012. Prior to the full album release, Stones Throw released the two halves of the album separately on vinyl as well as digitally exclusively through their website. Alone was released on July 30 and Together followed on October 2. He spent much of 2016 at work on Common’s much-heralded Black America Again album, which featured Stevie Wonder on the title song and included a performance at the White House as part of NPR’s “Tiny Desk Concerts” series. On February 24, 2017 Riggins released his second album on Stones Throw, Headnod Suite.

Along with Common and Robert Glasper, Riggins received the award for Outstanding Original Music & Lyrics at the 69th Primetime Creative Arts Emmy Awards for the song “Letter to the Free” which appeared in Ava DuVernay's Netflix documentary “13th”.

He currently lives in Los Angeles, California.

Discography

Albums
Alone Together (2012)
Headnod Suite (2017)
Pardon My French (2020) (as Jahari Massamba Unit with Madlib)

Production credits
with Common'1997: One Day It'll All Make Sense2000: Like Water For Chocolate2002: Electric Circus2003: Come Close (Remix) (Closer)2005: Be2007: Finding Forever2016: Black America Again "Joy and Peace" (featuring Bilal)
 "Home" (featuring Bilal)
 "Black America Again" (featuring Stevie Wonder) (co-produced with Robert Glasper)
 "Love Star" (featuring Marsha Ambrosius and PJ) 
 "On a Whim Interlude"
 "Red Wine" (featuring Syd and Elena)
 "Pyramids"
 "Unfamiliar" (featuring PJ)
 "A Bigger Picture Called Free" (featuring Syd and Bilal)
 "The Day The Women Took Over" (featuring BJ The Chicago Kid)
 "Rain" (featuring John Legend) 
 "Little Chicago Boy" (featuring Tasha Cobbs)
 "Letter To The Free" (featuring Bilal) (co-produced with Robert Glasper)

with J Dilla
2001: Welcome 2 Detroit2002: The Diary2006: The Shiningwith others
1994: Stephen Scott - Renaissance1995: Mulgrew Miller - Getting to Know You 
1996: Rodney Whitaker - Children of The Light1996: Eric Reed - Musicale1998: Rodney Whitaker - Hidden Kingdom1999: Junko Onishi - Fragile1999: Oscar Peterson, Ray Brown and Milt Jackson - The very tall band, live at the Blue Note2000: The Ray Brown Trio - Some of My Best Friends Are... The Trumpet players2001: Daft Punk - Aerodynamic (Remix)2002: Mulgrew Miller - The Sequel2002: Slum Village - Dirty District2002: Slum Village - Trinity (Past, Present and Future)2002: The Roots - Phrenology2003: Dwele - Subject2003: The Ray Brown Trio - Walk On2003: Mulgrew Miller - Live at Yoshi's, Vol. 12003: Mulgrew Miller - Live at Yoshi's, Vol. 22003: The Detroit Experiment - The Detroit Experiment2005: Slum Village - Prequel to a Classic2006: Gilles Peterson - Back in Brazil2007: Consequence - Don't Quit Your Day Job!2008: Keziah Jones - Nigerian Wood2008: Erykah Badu - New Amerykah Part One (4th World War)2009: Diana Krall - Quiet Nights - Live in Madrid2010: Erykah Badu - New Amerykah Part Two (Return of the Ankh)2010: Miguel Atwood-Ferguson - Timeless Suite For Ma Dukes2011: M.E.D. - Classic2012: Madlib - Medicine Show: The Brick2012: Paul McCartney - Kisses on the Bottom2014: Theo Croker - Afro Physicist2015: Orrin Evans - The Evolution of Oneself2015: Diana Krall - Wallflower2015: Earl Sweatshirt - I Don't Like Shit, I Don't Go Outside: An Album by Earl Sweatshirt2016: Elzhi - Lead Poison2016: Esperanza Spalding - Emily’s D+Evolution2016: Norah Jones - Day Breaks2016: Kanye West - The Life of Pablo2016: Kaytranada - 99.9%2017: Nick Grant - Return of the Cool2018: Kandace Springs - Indigo2020: Diana Krall - This Dream of You2022: Denzel Curry - Melt My Eyez See Your FutureAwards and honors
 Primetime Emmy Award for Outstanding Original Music and Lyrics, Common, Robert Glasper and Karriem Riggins for "Letter to the Free" from the documentary film 13th'', 2017

References

External links
 Official website

1975 births
Living people
Jazz musicians from Michigan
Musicians from Detroit
20th-century American drummers
20th-century American male musicians
21st-century American drummers
21st-century American male musicians
American jazz drummers
American male drummers
American male jazz musicians
August Greene members
Hip hop record producers